Bosnia and Herzegovina v Serbia and Montenegro [2007] ICJ 2 (also called the Application of the Convention on the Prevention and Punishment of the Crime of Genocide) is a public international law case decided by the International Court of Justice.

Facts
The claim filed by Dr. Francis Boyle, an adviser to Alija Izetbegović during the Bosnian War, alleged that Serbia had attempted to exterminate the Bosniak (Bosnian Muslim) population of Bosnia and Herzegovina. The case was heard in the International Court of Justice (ICJ) in The Hague, Netherlands, and ended on 9 May 2006.

Preliminary issues
The Respondent, Serbia and Montenegro ("Serbia") first raised an issue of jurisdiction. Serbia contends that the ICJ has no jurisdiction over it as it was not a continuator State of Socialist Federal Republic of Yugoslavia ("SFRY"). As such, it was not party to the Genocide Convention when the then proceedings were instituted, neither was it party to the Statute of the Court. Bosnia and Herzegovina ("Bosnia") argues that res judicata applies, as the issues raised by Serbia has already been resolved in the 1996 Judgment of the same set of proceedings that dealt with preliminary objections. The Court ruled that res judicata applies to preclude reconsideration of the jurisdictional issues raised by Serbia.

The second major contention pertains to the scope and meaning of Article IX of the Genocide Convention. 

There was a dispute about the obligations of Treaty Parties. Yugoslavia submitted to the ICJ an argument that the only obligations of the state parties to the Convention are to prevent and punish genocide by legislation, prosecution or extradition. Yugolavia's argument that the state party could not be held responsible itself for acts of genocide was rejected by the ICJ.

The Court held that interpretation of the Convention turns on the ordinary meaning of its terms read in their context and in light of its object and purpose. The Court notes that the purpose of the Convention is to criminalize genocide as crime under international law, and to enshrine an unqualified, independent undertaking by the contracting parties to prevent and punish genocide. On these observations, the Court held that the obligation to prevent genocide necessarily implies the prohibition of the commission of genocide, as "it would be paradoxical if States were thus under an obligation to prevent, so far as within their power, commission of genocide by persons over whom they have a certain influence, but were not forbidden to commit such acts through their own organs, persons over whom they have such firm control that their conduct is attributable to the State concerned under international law.".

Judgment
The ICJ held that the Srebrenica massacre was a genocide. It stated the following:

The Court found—although not unanimously—that Serbia was neither directly responsible for the Srebrenica genocide, nor that it was complicit in it, but it did rule that Serbia had committed a breach of the Genocide Convention by failing to prevent the genocide from occurring and for not cooperating with the International Criminal Tribunal for the former Yugoslavia (ICTY) in punishing the perpetrators of the genocide, in particular General Ratko Mladić, and for violating its obligation to comply with the provisional measures ordered by the Court. The then Vice-President of the Court, Awn Shawkat Al-Khasawneh, dissented on the grounds that "Serbia's involvement, as a principal actor or accomplice, in the genocide that took place in Srebrenica is supported by massive and compelling evidence."

The Court found:

Dissenting opinion
The Vice-President of the International Court of Justice, Judge Al-Khasawneh, dissented:

Significance
Serbia's violations of its obligations stem not only from the Convention on the Prevention and Punishment of the Crime of Genocide but also from two "provisional protective measures" issued by the International Court of Justice in April and September 1993. The then Federal Republic of Yugoslavia was ordered explicitly "to do everything in its power to prevent the crimes of genocide and to make sure that such crimes are not committed by military or paramilitary formations operating under its control or with its support." The judges concluded that despite this explicit order, Serbia did nothing in July 1995 to prevent the Srebrenica massacre, although it "should normally have been aware of the serious danger that acts of genocide would be committed."

In reaching this decision, the court referred to the standard set by Nicaragua v. United States, in which the United States was found not to be legally responsible for the actions of the Contra guerrillas despite their common goal and  widely publicised support in the Iran-Contra Affair.

Furthermore, according to the ICJ's judgement, "it is established by overwhelming evidence that massive killings in specific areas and detention camps throughout the territory of Bosnia-Herzegovina were perpetrated during the conflict" and that "the victims were in large majority members of the protected group, the Bosniaks, which suggests that they may have been systematically targeted by the killings." Moreover, "it has been established by fully conclusive evidence that members of the protected group were systematically victims of massive mistreatment, beatings, rape and torture causing serious bodily and mental harm, during the conflict and, in particular, in the detention camps." The Court accepted that these acts, on the part of the Serb forces, had been committed, but that there was inconclusive evidence of the specific intent to destroy the Bosniaks as a group in whole or in part. This includes the period up to 19 May 1992, when Bosnian Serb forces were under the formal control of the Federal Republic of Yugoslavia.

ICJ President Dame Rosalyn Higgins noted that while there was substantial evidence of events in Bosnia and Herzegovina that may amount to war crimes or crimes against humanity, the Court had no jurisdiction to make findings in that regard, as the case dealt "exclusively with genocide in a limited legal sense and not in the broader sense sometimes given to this term."

The Court further decided that, following Montenegro's declaration of independence in May 2006, Serbia, Serbia and Montenegro's successor, was the only Respondent party in the case, but that "any responsibility for past events involved at the relevant time the composite State of Serbia and Montenegro."

In reviewing the case in the judgement of Jorgić v. Germany Jorgić v. Germany], on 12 July 2007 the European Court of Human Rights quoted from the ICJ ruling on the Bosnian genocide case to explain that ethnic cleansing was not enough on its own to establish that a genocide had occurred:

Trial schedule
First round of argument
February 27, 2006 through March 7, 2006, Bosnia and Herzegovina
March 8, 2006 through March 16, 2006, Serbia and Montenegro
Hearing of experts, witnesses and witness-experts
March 17, 2006 through March 21, 2006, Bosnia and Herzegovina
March 22, 2006 through March 28, 2006, Serbia and Montenegro
Second round
April 18, 2006 through April 24, 2006, Bosnia and Herzegovina
May 2, 2006 through May 9, 2006, Serbia and Montenegro

See also
 List of Bosnian genocide prosecutions
 Croatia–Serbia genocide case
 List of International Court of Justice cases

Notes

References
ICJ documents
ICJ Press Release 2007/8
Summary of the Judgment of 26 February 2007
Application of the Convention on the Prevention and Punishment of the Crime of Genocide (Bosnia and Herzegovina v. Serbia and Montenegro) - case 91 - Judgment of 26 February 2007
Application of the Convention on the Prevention and Punishment of the Crime of Genocide (Bosnia and Herzegovina v. Serbia and Montenegro): List of judgements

Journals
Dimitrijević, Vojin, and Marko Milanović. "The strange story of the Bosnian genocide case." Leiden Journal of International Law 21.1 (2008): 65-94.

News articles
IWPR staff. Serbia and Montenegro on Trial for Genocide, TU No 441, Institute for War & Peace Reporting, 24 February 2006
Posner, Eric (poster), Article in the Boston Globe: Bosnia v. Serbia on the blog site on the University of Chicago law school 9 March 2006.
Traynor, Ian. Court starts hearing Bosnia's genocide claim, The Guardian, 27 February 2006
Staff. Bosnia-Herzegovina will win its law suit in The Hague - interview with Srda Popovic, Bosnia Report, Bosnian Institute, 31 May 2006 — An interview with a Serbian legal expert who thought that Bosnia would win the case.
Hudson, Alexandra. Serbia cleared of genocide, Reuters, 27 February 2007
Simons, Marlise. Genocide Court Ruled for Serbia Without Seeing Full War Archive, The New York Times, April 9, 2007
Tosh, Caroline Genocide Acquittal Provokes Legal Debate, TU No 491, Institute for War & Peace Reporting 2 March 2007.
Hoare, Marko Attila. The International Court of Justice and the Decriminalisation of Genocide, Bosnia Report, 9 March 2007

Bosnian genocide
International Court of Justice cases
2007 in international relations
2007 in case law
2007 in Bosnia and Herzegovina
2007 in Serbia
Bosnia and Herzegovina–Serbia relations
Bosnia and Herzegovina–Montenegro relations
Politics of Serbia and Montenegro
Serbia and Montenegro law
Foreign relations of Serbia and Montenegro